David Shields (born April 24, 1967) is a Canadian retired ice hockey center who was an All-American for Denver.

Career
Shields was a high-scoring player in junior hockey, ending his tenure as the league's second leading scorer. He joined Denver in 1986 and continued to produce. He was named WCHA Freshman of the Year after leading the Pioneers in scoring and was drafted by the Minnesota North Stars after the season. Shields' sophomore season was derailed by injury and he didn't get back on track until his senior season. In Shields' final year he finished in the top 10 in the nation and was named an All-American. Despite his efforts, Denver finished with a losing record and were knocked out in the conference quarterfinals. Shields retired as a player after graduating.

Statistics

Regular season and playoffs

Awards and honors

References

External links

1967 births
Living people
AHCA Division I men's ice hockey All-Americans
Canadian ice hockey centres
Denver Pioneers men's ice hockey players
Minnesota North Stars draft picks
Penticton Knights players
Ice hockey people from Calgary